Hallvard Sandnes ( March 27, 1893 - July 25, 1968) was a Norwegian schoolteacher and writer.

Biography
Sandnes was born in  the village of  Sandnes  in Aust-Agder, Norway.  He studied education at Voss Folk High School (Voss Folkehøgskule) and at Kristiansand Teacher Training College (Kristiansand lærerskole)  with Vetle Vislie  (1858–1933) as an instructor. From 1915 he was a teacher at Høydal in Volda.  From  1919, he taught in  Stavanger,  including from  1921 to 1960  at Kvalberg School in Hetland. During  the last ten years, he served  as principal.

He made his literary debut in 1913. Among his books are Fjellkongen from 1924, Skjoldmøyane from 1926, and Norigards-Ram'n from 1928.
In the 1940s, he created the science fiction comics series Ingeniør Knut Berg, along with Jostein Øvrelid (1910-1983).

He was awarded the Melsom Prize (Melsom-prisen) in 1925. Sandnes died during 1968 and was buried in the cemetery at Hinna Church in Stavanger.

References

1893 births
1968 deaths
People from Bygland
Norwegian educators
Norwegian writers
Norwegian comics writers
Norwegian schoolteachers